Drig Pal Shah is an Indian politician from Janata Party and was the member of 6th Lok Sabha from Bastar constituency then in Madhya Pradesh in 1977 Indian elections. He started his political career in 1967 when he was elected to Madhya Pradesh Legislative Assembly.

References

1941 births
Year of death missing
India MPs 1977–1979
Janata Party politicians
Bharatiya Lok Dal politicians
Possibly living people
People from Bastar district
Lok Sabha members from Uttar Pradesh
Madhya Pradesh MLAs 1967–1972